Hail! Hail! Rock 'n' Roll is an album by Chuck Berry and soundtrack to the film of the same name, which was released in 1987 under record label, MCA. The album was recorded live at the Fox Theatre, St Louis, Missouri, and Berry Park, Wentzville, Missouri, on October 6 and October 16, 1986. The event was held to celebrate Berry's 60th birthday and it included several special guests. The album does not include the Berry song "School Days", which includes the line the album's title is derived from (although the song does appear in the film).

The release of this album on MCA was something of a homecoming for Berry, who from 1954 to 1966 and again from 1970 to 1975 recorded for Chess Records which, by 1986, was now part of MCA.

Track listing
 "Maybellene" – 2:37
 "Around and Around" – 2:24
 "Sweet Little Sixteen" – 2:42
 "Brown Eyed Handsome Man" – 2:28
 "Memphis, Tennessee" – 3:08
 "Too Much Monkey Business" – 2:57
 "Back In The USA" – 3:29
 "Wee Wee Hours" – 5:24
 "Johnny B. Goode" – 3:13
 "Little Queenie" – 3:41
 "Rock and Roll Music" – 3:45
 "Roll Over Beethoven" – 3:15
 "I'm Through With Love" – 2:50

Personnel
Chuck Berry – Guitar, Vocals
Johnnie Johnson – Piano 
Keith Richards – Guitar
Chuck Leavell – Organ 
Bobby Keys – Saxophone
Joey Spampinato – Bass
Steve Jordan – drums 
Ingrid Berry – Vocals
Eric Clapton – Guitar, Vocals (on track 8)
Robert Cray – Guitar, Vocals (on track 4)
Etta James – Vocals (on track 11)
Julian Lennon – Vocals (on track 9)
Linda Ronstadt – Vocals (on track 7)

References

1987 live albums
Chuck Berry live albums
1987 soundtrack albums
Documentary film soundtracks
MCA Records soundtracks
MCA Records live albums